Ethics: Origin and Development is a book by Peter Kropotkin, published posthumously in 1921. It continues the argument of Mutual Aid, that sociable morality is essential to human survival. It was translated into English by Louis S. Friedland and Joseph R. Piroshnikoff in 1924.

Further reading

External links 
 Ethics: Origin and Development by Pëtr Kropotkin at the Anarchist Library

1921 non-fiction books
Works by Peter Kropotkin
Ethics books
Books published posthumously